Thekkumkara  is a village in Thrissur district in the state of Kerala, India.

Demographics
 India census, Thekkumkara had a population of 14236 with 6697 males and 7539 females.

References

Tourist Attraction in Tekkumkara 
1) Machad Mamangam

2) Vazhani Dam

3) Pattathippara Falls

4) Cheppara hillstation

5) St Antony's Church Machad  

6) Poomala Dam

Villages in Mukundapuram Taluk